Written by Frank Columb, The Lough Gowna Valley is the story of an Irish Midlands region, from its geological formation to the present.

This regional history includes chapters on paleontology, geology, zoology, violence, religion, gentry, the effect and aftermath of the Irish Rebellion of 1798, the Great Famine of Ireland, emigration and immigration, industry and enterprise, place names and ballads.

This book provoked a local outcry upon its release in 2002 due to its somewhat brutal appraisal of country life.

Irish literature